Red Sea Governorate is one of the 27 governorates (States) of Egypt. Located between the Nile and the Red Sea in the southeast of the country, its southern border forms part of Egypt's border with Sudan. Its capital and largest city is Hurghada.

Municipal divisions
The governorate is divided into municipal divisions with a total estimated population as of July 2017 of 361,480. In the case of Red Sea governorate, some are fully urban, some are fully rural, and some are a combination of rural and urban.

Geography
The Red Sea Governorate is bordered on the north by the Suez Governorate, to the east by the Red Sea, and to the west by the governorates of Aswan, Qena, Sohag, Asyut, al-Minya and Beni Suef. In the south it is bordered by Sudan's Red Sea State. It contains the disputed territory of the Halaib Triangle, including the Siyal Islands.

Population
The Red Sea Governate has seen large percentage increases in population in recent decades.

Heavy industrial zones
According to the Egyptian Governing Authority for Investment and Free Zones (GAFI), in affiliation with the Ministry of Investment and International Cooperation, the following industrial zones are located in this governorate:
Bernes 1
Bernes 2
Alaki 1
Alaki 2

Economy
The coast is a tourist destination. Since the early 1980s, Hurghada has been a popular destination for beach lovers and scuba divers. Tourism is also growing in the southern cities of Al-Qusair, Safaga and Marsa Alam. In addition to the numerous hotels and tourist establishments in the centers are located in Al-Bahr al-Ahmar 2 official nature reserves are to be developed for tourism or. The Wadi al-Gamal National Park (Valley of the camels) at Hamata near the town of Marsa Alam and the Gebel Elba National Park in disputed Halaib Triangle north of the town of Halaib. Besides a strong tourism industry, there is also a large offshore fishing industry. The area, which extends over the province, is rich in minerals, such as in phosphates. The Ras Gharib region contains 70% of Egypt's oil production.

References

External links
 Official Red Sea Governorate (English)
 El Watan News of Red Sea Governorate 

 
Governorates of Egypt